The Flying Dutchman was a sailing event on the Sailing at the 1968 Summer Olympics program in Acapulco. Seven races were scheduled. 62 sailors, on 30 boats, from 30 nations competed.

Results 

DNF = Did Not Finish, DNS= Did Not Start, DSQ = Disqualified 
 = Male,  = Female

Daily standings

Conditions at Acapulco 
Of the total of three race areas were needed during the Olympics in Acapulco. Each of the classes was new Olympic scoring system.

Notes

References 
 
 
 
 
 
 
 
 

 

Flying Dutchman
Flying Dutchman (dinghy)